Manhattan Skyline is a Norwegian mathcore band.

Manhattan Skyline may also refer to:

"Manhattan Skyline", a 1976 John Miles song from the album Stranger in the City
"Manhattan Skyline" (song), a 1987 song by Norwegian band A-ha
"Manhattan Skyline", a 1977 instrumental piece by David Shire, composed for the film Saturday Night Fever
The skyline of Manhattan, New York City